Classics: The Best of Sarah Brightman is a European-only compilation album by classical crossover soprano Sarah Brightman. An earlier version of Classics was released worldwide, except for Europe, in 2001. The cover art for both albums are the same (with the exception of the full title), but the track listings are different.

Track listing

Charts and certifications

Weekly charts

Certifications

VHS Release

Classics: The Best of Sarah Brightman is a VHS of the PBS special of the same name that aired in 2002. A copy of the show was made available to the audience if they made a financial contribution to their local PBS station. The VHS is hosted and narrated by Laura Savini along with Sarah herself. The two women talk in various locations including Sarah's home in London, her studio in Germany, one of Mozart's apartments, and in several concert halls where some of Sarah's most famous performances occurred.

Track listing

"Wishing You Were Somehow Here Again" (live) – From Sarah Brightman: In Concert from the Royal Albert Hall in London
"Just Show Me How To Love You" – music video with José Cura
"Anytime, Anywhere" – (live) – From Sarah Brightman One Night in Eden from the Sun City Super Bowl in South Africa
"Nessun Dorma" (live) From Sarah Brightman One Night in Eden from the Sun City Super Bowl in South Africa
"Figlio Perduto" (live) From Sarah Brightman La Luna: Live in Concert from the National Car Rental Center in Ft. Lauderdale
"Pie Jesu" (live) From Sarah Brightman La Luna: Live in Concert from the National Car Rental Center in Ft. Lauderdale
"La Luna" (live) From Sarah Brightman La Luna: Live in Concert from the National Car Rental Center in Ft. Lauderdale
"Dans La Nuit" (studio clip)
"La Wally/A Question of Honour" (live) From Sarah Brightman La Luna: Live in Concert from the National Car Rental Center in Ft. Lauderdale
"La Ci Darem La Mano" (live) -with Plácido Domingo – From The Millennium Gala Concert in Japan
"O Mio Babbino Caro" (live) – From Sarah Brightman: In Concert from the Royal Albert Hall in London
"Time to Say Goodbye" (live) -with Andrea Bocelli – From Andrea Bocelli's Statue of Liberty Concert in Jersey City

 The VHS contains bonus segments that did not air on PBS. This section includes music videos for: "Deliver Me", "Ave Maria", "Eden", "Whiter Shade of Pale", and "Winter Light".

References

External links

Sarah Brightman albums
2006 video albums
2006 compilation albums
2006 live albums
Live video albums
Music video compilation albums
Albums produced by Frank Peterson